Zoltan Zinn-Collis  (1940, Vysoké Tatry, Slovakia – 10 December 2012, Athy, Ireland) was a Slovak survivor of the Holocaust. He was one of only five living Holocaust survivors in Ireland. He died in his Athy home in Ireland on 10 December 2012. He thought himself to be born on 1 August 1940, but was not certain.

Family
Zinn-Collis is the son of a Slovak labourer of Jewish descent and a Hungarian Protestant woman. Collis had two sisters and one brother, the youngest sister being killed during the Holocaust at the age of 18 months. Zoltan's brother Aladar developed TB and died in Bergen-Belsen concentration camp in 1945. On 15 April 1945, Zoltan's mother died in Belsen, the same day the Red Cross arrived. His father, Adolf Zinn, who was thought to have died in Ravensbruck in 1944. His older sister, Edith, also survived the Holocaust and was brought to Ireland after the war.

Life in Ireland
The head of the Red Cross was Bob Collis, an Irish doctor. When Dr Collis first gathered Zoltan in his arms, the boy declared in German: "My father is dead. You are now my father." Bob Collis eventually adopted Zoltan and Edith and raised the two orphaned children in Ireland with the support of his wife Phyllis. Zoltan later became the manager of some of Ireland's leading hotels. He married an Irish woman and they raised four daughters together.

Books

External links
 http://www.independent.ie/entertainment/news-gossip/witness-to-a-hell-on-earth-134792.html
 https://web.archive.org/web/20071117042841/http://www.maverickhouse.com/author.html?aid=13&title=Zoltan%20Zinn-Collis&no_cache=1

References

1940 births
2012 deaths
20th-century Irish people
21st-century Irish people
Irish Jews
Irish people of Hungarian descent
Czechoslovak emigrants to Ireland
People of Slovak-Jewish descent
Bergen-Belsen concentration camp survivors